Bawa Lal Dayal (Lal Das Bairagi) (?–?) was a 14th-century Indian saint.

Biography 
Bawa Lal was born in the village of Kasur near Lahore, Punjab. His father was Bohlamal and his mother was Krishna Devi. He left his home at the age of 8 in search of his guru Chetan Swami and went to Lahore. From Lahore, he went to Behra, Gujranwala, Sialkot, Riyas, Rajouri, Kashmir, Mansarovar (Kailash Parvat) and then moved towards Badrinath and Kedarnath. Eventually, he reached Punjab. On reaching Lahore, near Shahdra at the bank of river Ravi, he had darshan of Chetan Swami.

Lal Dayal is mentioned in famous historical works including Samudra Sangama, Ḥasanāt al- 'Ārifīn, Majma' al-Bahrayn, Dabistān-i Madhāhib and Mathnawi-i Kajkulāh.

Temples

Main Temple: Lal Dwara Dhianpur 
Shri Dhianpur Dham is the most sacred holy place for pilgrimage among the followers of Bawa Lal Sampradaya. Dhianpur is a village in Gurdaspur district in the Indian state of Punjab. The 2001 census of India recorded Dhianpur as having a population of 3,095 forming 510 households.

In A.D. 1495, Bawa Lal arrived at this place with Dhiandasji, Gurumukh Lal and Kashi Ram and was so impressed with the beautiful and calm atmosphere that he gave it the name Dhianpur after the name of his disciple Dhiandas. The Shri Dhianpur Dham temple complex is situated on a hillock and has the sacred Samadhi of Bawa Lal and Gurumukh Lal, the first successor of Bawa Lal, Vyas Gaddi and Ram Mandir.

Shri Dhianpur Dham is visited by hundreds of thousands of people from around the world. The city of Ludhiana also has a temple of Lal Dyal situated at New Shivaji Nagar, Ludhiana since 1970.

Notable interactions with Prince Dara Shikoh 
The prince Dara Shikoh, elder son of Mughal emperor Shah Jahan, was depressed and did not have the courage to face his father, the shah Jahan, due to the defeat in Khandhar battle in A.D. 1653. He started residing in Lahore. Looking at his depressed state, Jahan's mirmunshi Chandra Bhan Brahman advised Dara Shikoh to meet Bawa Lal. On hearing his praise, he was influenced and wanted to have darshan of Shri Bawa Lal ji.

He held a series of interviews with Bawa Lal and discussed with him about the life of the ascetics,  the relationship between the guru and the devotees, the circles of life and death, idol worship, the path of spiritual salvation and various other topics.

From 1652 to 1653, Dārā held discussions with Lāl Dās in Lahore.

Dara held Lāl Dās in the highest regard as evidenced by the introduction and praise. He introduces Lāl Dās with the following words in his Ḥasanāt al-'Ārifīn: "Lāl Mundiyya, who is amongst the perfect Gnostics – I have seen none among the Hindus who has reached such 'irfān and spiritual strength as he has." He also quotes three aphorisms that he heard directly from Lāl Dās. 
 In the first, Lāl Dās is quoted as having said "do not become a Shaykh, or a walī, or a miracle worker; rather, become a sincere faqīr (faqīr-i bīsākhtagī)."
 In the second aphorism, Lāl Dās tells Dārā that "in every community there is a perfect Gnostic, so that God shall grant salvation to that particular community through him. Therefore, you should not condemn any community."
 In the third and last aphorism, Lāl Dās, on the authority of Kabīr, describes four types of guide: The first type is like gold, for they cannot make others similar to themselves; 
the second type is like an elixir—whoever reaches them becomes gold, but they cannot transform others; 
the third type is like the sandalwood tree, which has the ability to create another sandalwood tree if that tree is prepared for it, but not otherwise; the fourth type is like a lamp, and he is the one known as the "perfect guide," indeed from one lamp a hundred thousand lamps are illuminated.

Ram Sundar Das 
On November 1, 2001, Ram Sundar Das was enthroned as the Acharya of Shri Dhianpur Dham. Ram Sundar Das is the 15th Vaishnavacharya of Shri Dhianpur Dham and the present divine successor of Bawa Lal.

References

Indian Hindu saints
People from Kasur District
People from Punjab, India